Regierungsbezirk Kleve (or Cleves) was a Regierungsbezirk, or government region, of the Prussian Province of Jülich-Cleves-Berg.

The creation of the administrative region was decreed on April 30, 1815; it became active on 22 April 1816. Regierungsbezirk Kleve was incorporated into Regierungsbezirk Düsseldorf on 22 June 1822.

Districts
The Kleve region included the following districts:
Dinslaken
Geldern
Kempen
Kleve
Rees
Rheinberg

1822 disestablishments in Europe
Government regions of Prussia
Former states and territories of North Rhine-Westphalia
History of the Rhineland
States and territories established in 1815
1815 establishments in Prussia